Birkenia is a genus of extinct anaspid fish from Middle Silurian strata of Northern Europe, and Middle Silurian to possibly Earliest Devonian strata of Arctic Canada. Birkeniid anaspids are covered by a series of small plates on the head and rod-shaped scales in a cheveron-like pattern on the trunk.  
 
In addition to whole specimens and scale microfossils of B. elegans, which are found in Great Britain and Scandinavia, scales of a second species, B. robusta, are found in Late Silurian strata of Scandinavia and Estonia. The scales of B. robusta differ from those of B. elegans in that, as the specific epithet suggests, the scales of the former are more robustly proportioned than those of the latter. Fossil specimens also show a rib that is modified by being narrow at the ends and gradually broadens and rises towards the middle of the scale, where a major elevation is developed that is expressed as a raised and slightly angled ridge.

References

Silurian fish of North America
Silurian fish of Europe
Llandovery genus first appearances
Early Devonian genus extinctions
Early Devonian fish of North America
Birkeniiformes genera
Fossil taxa described in 1899